The 2014–15 New York Knicks season was the 69th season of the franchise in the National Basketball Association (NBA). On March 28, the Knicks set a new franchise-record 60 losses in a season, finishing at 65. The Knicks missed the playoffs for the second consecutive season, and for the tenth out of fourteen since 2001–02. This particular season has been commonly referred to as the worst season in Knicks history as it was the first time they had lost more than 60 games in franchise history. The Lakers also lost more than 60 games that year, leaving the Utah Jazz as the sole franchise to not have a 60+ losing record.

Midseason, the Knicks were dealt with a major blow as both Iman Shumpert and J.R. Smith were traded to the Cleveland Cavaliers.

Preseason

Draft picks

Regular season

Standings

Game log

Preseason

|- style="background:#fcc;"
| 1 
| October 8
| @ Boston
| 
| Tim Hardaway Jr. (18)
| Tim Hardaway Jr. (6)
| Carmelo Anthony (4)
| XL Center (8,462)
| 0–1
|- style="background:#cfc;"
| 2 
| October 11
| @ Boston
| 
| Carmelo Anthony (16)
| Samuel Dalembert (8)
| Samuel Dalembert (2)
| Mohegan Sun Arena (9,252)
| 1–1
|- style="background:#fcc;"
| 3 
| October 13
| Toronto
| 
| J. R. Smith (10)
| Amar'e Stoudemire (8)
| Iman Shumpert (6)
| Madison Square Garden (19,812)
| 1–2
|- style="background:#cfc;"
| 4 
| October 14
| @ Philadelphia
| 
| Carmelo Anthony (17)
| Carmelo Anthony (7)
| Iman Shumpert (4)
| Carrier Dome (11,259)
| 2–2
|- style="background:#fcc;"
| 5 
| October 20
| Milwaukee
| 
| Carmelo Anthony (24)
| Carmelo Anthony (9)
| Carmelo Anthony (6)
| Madison Square Garden (19,812)
| 2–3
|- style="background:#cfc;"
| 6 
| October 22
| Washington
| 
| Carmelo Anthony (30)
| Amar'e Stoudemire (8)
| Samuel Dalembert (5)
| Madison Square Garden (19,812)
| 3–3
|- style="background:#fcc;"
| 7 
| October 24
| @ Toronto
| 
| Carmelo Anthony (24)
| Samuel Dalembert (10)
| Pablo Prigioni (7)
| Bell Centre (20,738)
| 3–4

Regular season

|-style="background:#fcc;"
| 1
| October 29
| Chicago
| 
| Carmelo Anthony (22)
| Amar'e Stoudemire (11)
| Carmelo Anthony (6)
| Madison Square Garden19,812
| 0–1
|-style="background:#cfc;"
| 2
| October 30
| @ Cleveland
|  
| Carmelo Anthony (25)
| Quincy Acy (10)
| J. R. Smith (7)
| Quicken Loans Arena20,562
| 1–1

|-style="background:#cfc;"
| 3
| November 2
| Charlotte
| 
| Carmelo Anthony (28)
| Amar'e Stoudemire (10)
| Shane Larkin (5)
| Madison Square Garden19,812
| 2–1
|-style="background:#fcc;"
| 4
| November 4
| Washington
|  
| Iman Shumpert (19)
| Amar'e Stoudemire (12)
| J. R. Smith (4)
| Madison Square Garden19,812
| 2–2
|-style="background:#fcc;"
| 5
| November 5
| @ Detroit
|  
| Tim Hardaway Jr. (20)
| Amar'e Stoudemire (8)
| Carmelo Anthony (8)
| The Palace of Auburn Hills11,915
| 2–3
|-style="background:#fcc;"
| 6
| November 7
| @ Brooklyn
|  
| Carmelo Anthony (19)
| Iman Shumpert (9)
| Quincy Acy (5)
| Barclays Center17,732
| 2–4
|-style="background:#fcc;"
| 7
| November 8
| @ Atlanta
|   
| Carmelo Anthony (20) 
| Carmelo Anthony (9)
| Iman Shumpert (7)
| Philips Arena17,521
| 2–5
|-style="background:#fcc;"
| 8
| November 10
| Atlanta
| 
| Carmelo Anthony (25)
| Amar'e Stoudemire (10)
| Carmelo Anthony (7)
| Madison Square Garden19,812
| 2–6
|-style="background:#fcc;"
| 9
| November 12
| Orlando
| 
| Carmelo Anthony (27)
| Iman Shumpert (8)
| Samuel Dalembert (4)
| Madison Square Garden19,812
| 2–7
|-style="background:#fcc;"
| 10
| November 14
| Utah
| 
| Carmelo Anthony (46)
| Carmelo Anthony (7)
| Shane Larkin (4)
| Madison Square Garden19,812
| 2–8
|-style="background:#cfc;"
| 11
| November 16
| Denver
| 
| Anthony, Smith (28)
| Carmelo Anthony (9)
| J. R. Smith (4)
| Madison Square Garden19,812
| 3–8
|-style="background:#fcc;"
| 12
| November 18
| @ Milwaukee
| 
| Carmelo Anthony (26)
| Iman Shumpert (8)
| Iman Shumpert (8)
| BMO Harris Bradley Center12,190
| 3–9
|-style="background:#fcc;"
| 13
| November 19
| @ Minnesota
| 
| Carmelo Anthony (20)
| Acy, Wear (8)
| Larkin, Smith (4)
| Target Center15,304
| 3–10
|-style="background:#cfc;"
| 14
| November 22
| Philadelphia
| 
| Carmelo Anthony (25)
| Amar'e Stoudemire (11)
| Calderón, Shumpert (3)
| Madison Square Garden19,812
| 4–10
|-style="background:#fcc;"
| 15
| November 24
| @ Houston
| 
| Carmelo Anthony (14)
| Acy, Stoudemire (8)
| Calderón, Shumpert (5)
| Toyota Center18,133
| 4–11
|-style="background:#fcc;"
| 16
| November 26
| @ Dallas
| 
| José Calderón (21)
| Samuel Dalembert (13)
| Pablo Prigioni (6)
| American Airlines Center20,352
| 4–12
|-style="background:#fcc;"
| 17
| November 28
| @ Oklahoma City
| 
| Amar'e Stoudemire (20)
| Amar'e Stoudemire (9)
| J. R. Smith (4)
| Chesapeake Energy Arena18,203
| 4–13
|-style="background:#fcc;"
| 18
| November 30
| Miami
| 
| Carmelo Anthony (31)
| Amar'e Stoudemire (12)
| José Calderón (6)
| Madison Square Garden19,812
| 4–14

|-style="background:#fcc;"
| 19
| December 2
| Brooklyn
| 
| Carmelo Anthony (20)
| Anthony, Stoudemire (9)
| José Calderón (7) 
| Madison Square Garden19,812
| 4–15
|-style="background:#fcc;"
| 20
| December 4
| Cleveland
| 
| Tim Hardaway Jr. (20)
| Carmelo Anthony (10)
| Anthony, Prigioni, Shumpert (4)
| Madison Square Garden19,812
| 4–16
|-style="background:#fcc;"
| 21
| December 5
| @ Charlotte
| 
| Carmelo Anthony  (32)
| Samuel Dalembert (8)
| Pablo Prigioni (7)
| Time Warner Cable Arena19,102
| 4–17
|-style="background:#fcc;"
| 22
| December 7
| Portland
| 
| Carmelo Anthony (23)
| Anthony, Stoudemire (10)
| Anthony, Calderón, Shumpert (3)
| Madison Square Garden19,812
| 4–18
|-style="background:#fcc;"
| 23
| December 9
| @ New Orleans
|  
| Amar'e Stoudemire (26)
| Carmelo Anthony (8)
| José Calderón (6)
| Smoothie King Center13,789
| 4–19
|-style="background:#fcc;"
| 24
| December 10
| @ San Antonio
| 
| Tim Hardaway Jr. (23)
| Samuel Dalembert (6)
| Iman Shumpert (6)
| AT&T Center18,581
| 4–20
|-style="background:#cfc;"
| 25
| December 12
| @ Boston
| 
| Carmelo Anthony (22)
| Amar'e Stoudemire (7)
| José Calderón (7) 
| TD Garden17,989
| 5–20
|-style="background:#fcc;"
| 26
| December 14
| Toronto
| 
| Carmelo Anthony (34)
| Carmelo Anthony (9)
| José Calderón (5) 
| Madison Square Garden19,812
| 5–21
|-style="background:#fcc;"
| 27
| December 16
| Dallas
| 
| Carmelo Anthony  (26)
| 4 tied (5)
| Pablo Prigioni (9) 
| Madison Square Garden19,812
| 5–22
|-style="background:#fcc;"
| 28
| December 18
| @ Chicago
| 
| Tim Hardaway Jr. (23)
| Cole Aldrich (10)
| Tim Hardaway Jr. (5)
| United Center21,875
| 5–23
|-style="background:#fcc;"
| 29
| December 20
| Phoenix
| 
| Carmelo Anthony  (25)
| Samuel Dalembert (12)
| Pablo Prigioni (7) 
| Madison Square Garden19,812
| 5–24
|-style="background:#fcc;"
| 30
| December 21
| @ Toronto
| 
| Carmelo Anthony  (28)
| Cole Aldrich (10)
| José Calderón (10) 
| Air Canada Centre19,800
| 5–25
|-style="background:#fcc;"
| 31
| December 25
| Washington
| 
| Carmelo Anthony  (28)
| Amar'e Stoudemire (7)
| José Calderón (4) 
| Madison Square Garden19,812
| 5–26
|-style="background:#fcc;"
| 32
| December 27
| @ Sacramento
| 
| Carmelo Anthony  (36)
| Carmelo Anthony  (11)
| José Calderón (9) 
| Sleep Train Arena17,317
| 5–27
|-style="background:#fcc;"
| 33
| December 28
| @ Portland
| 
| Tim Hardaway Jr. (17)
| Cole Aldrich (19)
| Hardaway Jr., Larkin (5)
| Moda Center19,800
| 5–28
|-style="background:#fcc;"
| 34
| December 31
| @ L.A. Clippers
| 
| Carmelo Anthony (19)
| Jason Smith (10)
| Aldrich, Larkin (5)
| Staples Center19,198
| 5–29

|-style="background:#fcc;"
| 35
| January 2
| Detroit
|  
| J. R. Smith (22)
| Cole Aldrich (14)
| J. R. Smith (5)
| Madison Square Garden19,812
| 5–30
|-style="background:#fcc;"
| 36
| January 4
| Milwaukee
| 
| Tim Hardaway Jr. (17)
| Acy, Aldrich, Smith (7)
| José Calderón (5) 
| Madison Square Garden19,812
| 5–31
|-style="background:#fcc;"
| 37
| January 5
| @ Memphis
| 
| Quincy Acy (19)
| Quincy Acy (14)
| Shane Larkin (8)
| FedExForum16,888
| 5–32
|-style="background:#fcc;"
| 38
| January 7
| @ Washington
| 
| José Calderón (17)
| Quincy Acy (9)
| 4 tied (3) 
| Verizon Center16,902
| 5–33
|-style="background:#fcc;"
| 39
| January 8
| Houston
| 
| Travis Wear (21)
| Cleanthony Early (6)
| Shane Larkin (5)
| Madison Square Garden19,812
| 5–34
|-style="background:#fcc;"
| 40
| January 10
| Charlotte
| 
| Quincy Acy (18)
| Cole Aldrich (12)
| Shane Larkin (4)
| Madison Square Garden19,812
| 5–35
|-style="background:#fcc;"
| 41
| January 15
| @ Milwaukee
| 
| Carmelo Anthony (25)
| Lou Amundson (6)
| José Calderón (9)
| The O2 Arena18,689
| 5–36
|-style="background:#cfc;"
| 42
| January 19
| New Orleans
| 
| Carmelo Anthony (24)
| Carmelo Anthony (9)
| Jason Smith (6)
| Madison Square Garden19,812
| 6–36
|-style="background:#cfc;"
| 43
| January 21
| @ Philadelphia
| 
| Carmelo Anthony (27)
| Carmelo Anthony (11)
| José Calderón (7)
| Wells Fargo Center13,201
| 7–36
|-style="background:#cfc;"
| 44
| January 23
| Orlando
| 
| Carmelo Anthony (25)
| Cole Aldrich (9)
| José Calderón (7)
| Madison Square Garden19,812
| 8–36
|-style="background:#fcc;"
| 45
| January 24
| @ Charlotte
| 
| Tim Hardaway Jr. (17)
| Cole Aldrich (13)
| Tim Hardaway Jr. (4)
| Time Warner Cable Arena19,117
| 8–37
|-style="background:#cfc;"
| 46
| January 28
| Oklahoma City
| 
| Carmelo Anthony (31)
| Jason Smith (11)
| José Calderón (8) 
| Madison Square Garden19,812
| 9–37
|-style="background:#fcc;"
| 47
| January 29
| @ Indiana
| 
| Carmelo Anthony (18)
| Jason Smith (7)
| José Calderón (6) 
| Bankers Life Fieldhouse15,665
| 9–38

|-style="background:#cfc;"
| 48
| February 1
| L.A. Lakers
| 
| Carmelo Anthony (31)
| Lou Amundson (13)
| Calderon, Smith (4)
| Madison Square Garden19,812
| 10–38
|-style="background:#fcc;"
| 49
| February 3
| Boston
| 
| Carmelo Anthony (21)
| Jason Smith (7)
| Galloway, Smith (5)
| Madison Square Garden19,812
| 10–39
|-style="background:#fcc;"
| 50
| February 6
| @ Brooklyn
| 
| Carmelo Anthony (21)
| Langston Galloway (11)
| José Calderón (7)
| Barclays Center17,732
| 10–40
|-style="background:#fcc;"
| 51
| February 7
| Golden State
| 
| Langston Galloway (15)
| Jason Smith (13)
| Shane Larkin (4)
| Madison Square Garden19,812
| 10–41
|-style="background:#fcc;"
| 52
| February 9
| @ Miami
| 
| Carmelo Anthony (26)
| Langston Galloway (9)
| José Calderón (6)
| American Airlines Arena19,851
| 10–42
|-style="background:#fcc;"
| 53
| February 11
| @ Orlando
| 
| Jason Smith (25)
| Jason Smith (7)
| José Calderón (7)
| Amway Center19,851
| 10–43
|- align="center"
| colspan="9" style="background:#bbcaff;" | All-Star Break
|-style="background:#fcc;"
| 54
| February 20
| Miami
| 
| Langston Galloway (19)
| Smith, Bargnani (6)
| José Calderón (9)
| Madison Square Garden19,812
| 10–44
|-style="background:#fcc;"
| 55
| February 22
| Cleveland
| 
| Langston Galloway (13)
| Tim Hardaway Jr. (7)
| Langston Galloway (5)
| Madison Square Garden19,812
| 10–45
|-style="background:#fcc;"
| 56
| February 25
| @ Boston
| 
| Andrea Bargnani (17)
| Jason Smith (10)
| José Calderón (7)
| TD Garden16,899
| 10–46
|-style="background:#cfc;"
| 57
| February 27
| @ Detroit
| 
| Andrea Bargnani (25)
| Lou Amundson (14)
| Langston Galloway (5)
| The Palace of Auburn Hills16,182
| 11–46
|-style="background:#cfc;"
| 58
| February 28
| Toronto
| 
| Tim Hardaway Jr. (22)
| Langston Galloway (8)
| Alexey Shved (5)
| Madison Square Garden19,812
| 12–46

|-style="background:#fcc;"
| 59
| March 3
| Sacramento
| 
| Alexey Shved (15)
| Aldrich, Shved (7)
| Shane Larkin (6)
| Madison Square Garden19,812
| 12–47
|-style="background:#fcc;"
| 60
| March 4
| @ Indiana
| 
| Andrea Bargnani (25)
| Lou Amundson (10)
| Bargnani, Larkin (4)
| Bankers Life Fieldhouse15,981
| 12–48
|-style="background:#fcc;"
| 61
| March 7
| Indiana
| 
| Andrea Bargnani (21)
| Cole Aldrich (11)
| Langston Galloway (4)
| Madison Square Garden19,812
| 12–49
|-style="background:#fcc;"
| 62
| March 9
| @ Denver
| 
| Alexey Shved (19)
| Aldrich, Thomas (8)
| Cleanthony Early (5)
| Pepsi Center14,153
| 12–50
|-style="background:#fcc;"
| 63
| March 10
| @ Utah
| 
| Alexey Shved (21)
| Cole Aldrich (13)
| Alexey Shved (7)
| EnergySolutions Arena17,121
| 12–51
|-style="background:#cfc;"
| 64
| March 12
| @ L.A. Lakers
| 
| Tim Hardaway Jr. (22)
| Alexey Shved (11)
| Alexey Shved (6)
| Staples Center18,997
| 13–51
|-style="background:#fcc;"
| 65
| March 14
| @ Golden State
| 
| Andrea Bargnani (18)
| Cole Aldrich (9)
| Aldrich, Shved (5) 
| Oracle Arena19,596
| 13–52
|-style="background:#fcc;"
| 66
| March 15
| @ Phoenix
| 
| Bargnani, Shved (18)
| Cole Aldrich (10)
| Langston Galloway (4)
| US Airways Center17,264
| 13–53
|-style="background:#cfc;"
| 67
| March 17
| San Antonio
| 
| Langston Galloway (22)
| Lou Amundson (17)
| Alexey Shved (7)
| Madison Square Garden19,812
| 14–53
|-style="background:#fcc;"
| 68
| March 19
| Minnesota
| 
| Langston Galloway (21)
| Lou Amundson (9)
| Alexey Shved (6) 
| Madison Square Garden19,812
| 14–54
|-style="background:#fcc;"
| 69
| March 20
| @ Philadelphia
| 
| Alexey Shved (25) 
| Bargnani, Shved (3) 
| Galloway, Larkin, Shved (3) 
| Wells Fargo Center10,079
| 14–55
|-style="background:#fcc;"
| 70
| March 22
| @ Toronto
| 
| Lance Thomas (24)
| Cole Aldrich (9)
| Shane Larkin (8)
| Air Canada Centre19,800
| 14–56
|-style="background:#fcc;"
| 71
| March 23
| Memphis
| 
| Langston Galloway (19)
| Aldrich, Galloway (7)
| Shane Larkin (7)
| Madison Square Garden19,812
| 14–57
|-style="background:#fcc;"
| 72
| March 25
| L.A. Clippers
| 
| Cleanthony Early (18)
| Jason Smith (8)
| Jason Smith (4)
| Madison Square Garden19,812
| 14–58
|-style="background:#fcc;"
| 73
| March 27
| Boston
| 
| Andrea Bargnani (25)
| Lou Amundson (9)
| Galloway, Larkin (6)
| Madison Square Garden19,812
| 14–59
|-style="background:#fcc;"
| 74
| March 28
| @ Chicago
| 
| Andrea Bargnani (14)
| Andrea Bargnani (7)
| Shane Larkin (8)
| United Center22,152
| 14–60

|-style="background:#fcc;"
| 75
| April 1
| Brooklyn
| 
| Andrea Bargnani (22)
| Lou Amundson (8) 
| Shane Larkin (7)
| Madison Square Garden19,812
| 14–61
|-style="background:#fcc;"
| 76
| April 3
| @ Washington
| 
| Ricky Ledo (21)
| Lou Amundson (10)
| Galloway, Ledo (3)
| Verizon Center19,389
| 14–62
|-style="background:#cfc;"
| 77
| April 5
| Philadelphia
| 
| Andrea Bargnani (25)
| Shane Larkin (11)
| Shane Larkin (7)
| Madison Square Garden19,812
| 15–62
|-style="background:#fcc;"
| 78
| April 8
| Indiana
| 
| Langston Galloway (19)
| Bargnani & Smith (6)
| Shane Larkin (4)
| Madison Square Garden19,812
| 15–63
|-style="background:#fcc;"
| 79
| April 10
| Milwaukee
| 
| Langston Galloway (20)
| Lou Amundson (11)
| Shane Larkin (5)
| Madison Square Garden19,812
| 15–64
|-style="background:#cfc;"
| 80
| April 11
| @ Orlando
| 
| Cole Aldrich (19)
| Cole Aldrich (14)
| Jason Smith (6)
| Amway Center17,207
| 16–64
|-style="background:#cfc;"
| 81
| April 13
| @ Atlanta
| 
| Langston Galloway (26)
| Jason Smith (9)
| Shane Larkin (7)
| Philips Arena18,265
| 17–64
|-style="background:#fcc;"
| 82
| April 15
| Detroit
| 
| Tim Hardaway Jr. (25)
| Cole Aldrich (15)
| Langston Galloway (7)
| Madison Square Garden19,812
| 17–65

Player statistics

Summer League

|-
|}

Preseason

|-
|}

Regular season

|-
|}

Injuries

Roster

Roster Notes
 Small forward Carmelo Anthony played 40 games (his last game being on February 9, 2015) but missed the rest of the season after undergoing left knee surgery to repair a patella tendon.

 Point guard José Calderón played 42 games (his last game being on February 25, 2015) but missed the rest of the season after undergoing a procedure on his strained left Achilles tendon.

Transactions

Trades

Free agents

Re-signed

Additions

Subtractions

Awards

References

External links
 2014–15 New York Knicks preseason at ESPN
 2014–15 New York Knicks regular season at ESPN

New York Knicks seasons
New York Knicks
New York Knicks
New York Knicks
2010s in Manhattan
Madison Square Garden